The 1502 class was a class of diesel locomotives built by Clyde Engineering, Eagle Farm for Queensland Railways between 1967 and 1969.

History
The 1502 class was an evolution of the 1460 class fitted with a more powerful Electro-Motive Diesel 645E engine and upgraded generators and traction motors. They operated services in South East Queensland including suburban trains in Brisbane.

In 1996, four were sold to Tranz Rail in New Zealand. After rebuilding at Hutt Workshops, they were placed in service with the Australian Transport Network in Tasmania as the DQ2000 class.

All had been withdrawn by 1999. In 2002, six were overhauled and fitted with  bogies from FreightCorp 49 class locomotives for use by Interail in New South Wales as the 423 class.

In 2005, seven have been exported to Ferrocarril de Antofagasta a Bolivia, Chile. In 2006, two were rebuilt and transferred to Australian Railroad Group for use in Western Australia as the AD class.

Class register

See also 
 New Zealand DQ and QR class locomotives

References

Clyde Engineering locomotives
Co-Co locomotives
Diesel locomotives of Queensland
Diesel locomotives of Tasmania
Queensland Rail locomotives
Railway locomotives introduced in 1967
3 ft 6 in gauge locomotives of Australia
Diesel-electric locomotives of Australia
Diesel-electric locomotives of Chile